Boris Borisov (born 2 July 1978) is a Bulgarian footballer, who is currently playing as a defender for Bulgarian club Vidima-Rakovski Sevlievo.

External links

1978 births
Living people
Bulgarian footballers
First Professional Football League (Bulgaria) players
PFC Vidima-Rakovski Sevlievo players
Association football defenders